Domingoa is a genus of orchids (family Orchidaceae), consisting of four currently recognised species at home in Mexico, Central America, Cuba, Hispaniola and Mona of the Greater Antilles.
The genus was established in 1913 by Rudolf Schlechter. Its name refers to Santo Domingo, an older name for Hispaniola.  The genus name is abbreviated Dga. in cultivation.

Species 
 Domingoa gemma (Rchb.f.) Van den Berg & Soto Arenas
 Domingoa haematochila (Rchb.f.) Carabia
 Domingoa nodosa  (Cogn.) Schltr. in I.Urban
 Domingoa purpurea (Lindl.) Van den Berg & Soto Arenas - Veracruz
 Domingoa × susiana Dod  (D. haematochila × D. nodosa)

References 

Laeliinae
Laeliinae genera
Flora of the Caribbean